Thomas Hodgkin, FBA (29 July 18312 March 1913) was a British historian, biographer, banker, and Quaker minister. Hodgkin's magnum opus, Italy and Her Invaders, was an eight-volume work on the history of the wars in the Late Roman Empire.

Biography
Hodgkin was son of John Hodgkin, barrister and Quaker minister, and Elizabeth Howard (daughter of Luke Howard).
In 1861 he married Lucy Ann (1841–1934) (daughter of Alfred Fox who created Glendurgan Garden and Sarah, born Lloyd, his wife). They had three sons and three daughters.

Having been educated as a member of the Society of Friends and taken the degree of B.A at University College London and obtained the additional degrees of D.C.L and Litt. D., likely at the University of Oxford. He became a partner in the banking house of Hodgkin, Barnett, Pease and Spence, Newcastle-on-Tyne, a firm afterwards amalgamated with Lloyds Bank.

While continuing in business as a banker, Hodgkin devoted a good deal of time to historical study, and soon became a leading authority on the history of the early Middle Ages, his books. His magnum opus, Italy and Her Invaders, was published in eight volumes.
He died at Falmouth on 2 March 1913. His and the Hodgkin family papers are held at the Wellcome Library in London.

Family

The family of Thomas and Lucy Hodgkin is listed as:

Lucy Violet (1869–1954) married John Holdsworth
John (died in infancy)
Edward (1872–1921) married Katie Wilson
Elizabeth, known as Lily (born 1874) married Herbert Gresford Jones
Ellen Sophie (1875–1965) married Robert Carr Bosanquet
Robert Howard (24 April 187728 June 1951) married Dorothy Smith. He was Provost of The Queen's College, Oxford, author of A History of the Anglo-Saxons (1935)
George (1880–1918) married Mary Wilson. Their son, Alan Hodgkin, received the 1963 Nobel Prize in Physiology.

Lucy Violet Hodgkin, later Holdsworth, was a writer and gave the 1919 Swarthmore Lecture under the title Silent Worship: The way of wonder. 
She assembled her father's letters and wrote a memorial to her brother, George, published in 1923.

Ellen Sophia, later Bosanquet, wrote an autobiography, published by her daughter Diana Hardman, as Late Harvest: Memories, letters poems.

Publications
Hodgkin's chief works are:
Italy and her Invaders (8 vols., Oxford, 1880–1899; vols. I, II, 1890, (revised 1892), vols. III, IV, 1892 (rev 1896), vols. V, VI, 1895, vols. VII, VIII, 1899); republished as The Barbarian Invasions of the Roman Empire, (8 vols., The Folio Society, 2001) 
The Dynasty of Theodosius (Oxford, 1889);
Theodoric the Goth (London, 1891);
An introduction to the Letters of Cassiodorus: being a condensed translation of the Variae Epistolae of Magnus Aurelius Cassiodorus, Senator (London, 1886).
He also wrote a Life of Charles the Great (London, 1897); Life of George Fox (Boston, 1896); and the opening volume of Longman's Political History of England (London, 1906).

Notes

External links

 
 
 
 Portrait stored at the National Portrait Gallery

1831 births
1913 deaths
19th-century English historians
English bankers
English Quakers
Thomas
Quaker writers
Fellows of the British Academy
19th-century English businesspeople